Aridhglas is a village on the Ross of Mull, Isle of Mull in Argyll and Bute, Scotland.

References 

Villages on the Isle of Mull